John Charles Hill (22 May 1862 – 29 March 1943) was the inaugural Suffragan Bishop of Hulme from 1924 until 1930.

Hill was educated at Harrow and Trinity College, Cambridge. After curacies in Kensington  and  Rotherham he was Rector of Halesowen then Rural Dean of Bury before his appointment to the episcopate.

References

External links

1862 births
People educated at Harrow School
Alumni of Trinity College, Cambridge
20th-century Church of England bishops
Bishops of Hulme
1943 deaths